The Royal Flush Gang is a group of supervillains appearing in DC Comics. The group, which debuted in Justice League of America #43 (March 1966), use a playing card theme. Their code names are based on the cards needed to form a royal flush in poker: Ace, King, Queen, Jack, and Ten. Joker occasionally affiliates himself with the gang, but is not a consistent member. The group returned to battle the Justice League of America many times, and also appeared in other comics, including Wonder Woman, Formerly Known as the Justice League and Superman. The group has been described as "some of the most original villains of their time".

The gang has also appeared in many animated television adaptations, including The Super Powers Team: Galactic Guardians in 1985, Batman Beyond in 1999 and 2000, Justice League in 2003 and 2005, and Batman: The Brave and the Bold in 2009 and 2010.

The Royal Flush Gang also made appearances in the live-action Arrowverse TV shows airing on the CW, renamed the Reston crime family. They debuted in the first season of Arrow in 2012, and also appeared in the first and eighth season of The Flash in 2015 and 2021. The comic book versions seen in the 2013 Forever Evil storyline were redesigned to follow the pattern set by their Arrow appearance.

Publication history
The Royal Flush Gang first appeared in Justice League of America #43 in March 1966 under the leadership of Professor Amos Fortune and were created by Gardner Fox and Mike Sekowsky.

Fictional team history

First Gang: Clubs

The original Royal Flush Gang was Professor Amos Fortune's childhood gang. King was a man named Kerry, Queen was a woman named Queenie, Jack was an unnamed man, and Ten was a strongman named Thomas Dillon. With Fortune himself as Ace, they fought the Justice League on two occasions using Fortune's luck-altering "stellaration" technology to realize the fortune-telling significance of playing cards.

After Fortune abandoned the Gang, a new Ace became the leader and they attempted to steal four paintings containing clues to a hidden treasure, but were thwarted by Joker's manipulations. Most of them then abandoned their criminal careers, although Jack briefly joined the Secret Society of Super Villains as "Hi-Jack".

Fortune's gang wore costumes based on the suit of clubs, but when they fought the Joker, the second Ace convinced them to change them to the suit of spades.

In the pages of JLA Classified, it was revealed the original Royal Flush Gang (sans Amos Fortune) reunited to fight the "Detroit Era" Justice League and their successors in the second gang. In this battle, the original King, Queen and Ten were all killed.

Second Gang: Spades
The second Royal Flush Gang was set up by Green Lantern villain Hector Hammond in Justice League of America #203. Hammond led the group as "Wildcard". This version wore costumes based on the suit of spades. The gang split up and went on to have separate criminal careers before re-establishing themselves, without Hammond. They were twice hired by Maxwell Lord as part of his manipulation of Justice League International. Later, they were reorganized and reoutfitted by a successor to the Golden Age Green Lantern villain Gambler masquerading as the Joker.

The membership of this group consists of:

King (Joe Carny) The so-called "King of the Hoboes", Carny also suffered from lung disease. As Hammond's agent, he wore a costume that technologically enhanced his natural charisma to the point of mind control. Following the metagene bomb in Invasion!, King became immortal. Although King is the highest-ranking member of the gang, in poker the Ace ranks as the highest card in a royal flush.

Queen (Mona Taylor) Taylor was originally a Broadway star whose career was destroyed by her ongoing alcoholism. As Hammond's agent, she wielded a sceptre that cast realistic illusions. After the Gambler reoutfitted the team, she began employing a wrist shooter that fires razor sharp spades.

Jack (name unknown) Originally a gigolo, he became a fugitive after inadvertently killing a client while attempting to steal her jewelry. As Hammond's agent, he wielded an energy-charged sword. The Gambler replaced his left eye with a cybernetically-activated laser weapon, making him a literal "one-eyed Jack". The removal of his eye to implant the laser initially impacted his sanity.

Ten (Wanda Wayland) Wayland was a test pilot fired for refusing her employer's sexual advances. As Hammond's agent, she wore a costume with energy blasters in its gloves. She has enhanced reflexes, and carries explosive playing cards.

Ace The first Ace ("Derek Reston") was a superstrong android in the form of an African-American man. A second Ace (Ernie Clay) was recruited by King and used a strength-enhancing exoskeleton provided by the Gambler. In more recent appearances in Starman and Infinite Crisis, however, the team was once again employing the robot Ace.

King, Queen and Ten also have blaster-pistols. The Gang fly on hovering playing cards. In the Gang's appearances in Teen Titans, Ten had organized runaways as "Ten's Little Indians", a gang of thieves dressed as the two through nine of spades and armed with bows and trick arrows.

Third Gang: All Suits
In the Post-Crisis DC Universe, there were multiple active, costumed members, some of whom derived their outfits and codenames from cards with pip values lower than ten. The Royal Flush Gang is now an organization that reaches across America, with cells in every major city. Instead of five members, each "cell" has fifty-two, split into four suits run by the "court cards". The Aces of Clubs, Diamonds, Hearts, and Spades are all androids. Each member has a playing card value, and those who rise or fall in the Gang's esteem gain or lose a "pip".

Notably, Stargirl's father Sam Kurtis was a "Two of Clubs"; upon defeating him, she transitioned from the Star-Spangled Kid identity to Stargirl in JSA: All-Stars.

In Infinite Crisis #2 (2005), the Joker tortures and kills the leadership of a local Spades cell of the Royal Flush Gang from an unspecified city, after being rejected by the Society for his "instability". The King is the last one left alive and he mocks the Joker for being rejected. The Joker kills the King with an electrical blast to the face. The dead gang is left in the ruins of a casino.

A new version of the Royal Flush Gang appears in Justice League of America (vol. 2) #35. This version is working under the authority of Amos Fortune, who is addressed by other members as "Wild Card". In the following issue, Fortune gives a history of the gang. It seems to combine the first and third gangs' histories/characteristics, with Fortune indicating that he was always running the group in some capacity. Ace of Spades is a man named Ernest Clay, Jack of Spades was a replacement for one that was a former gigolo, King of Spades was Joe Carny again, Queen of Spades was Mona Taylor, Six of Spades is an unnamed woman, and Ten of Spades was Wanda Wayland again.

Another cell of the expanded version, this one stylized as a street gang, appear as members of the Society in Villains United and several of its tie-ins in other comics. Ace of Spades was an unnamed buff man in sunglasses, Jack of Spades was Deuce Canyard, King of Spades was an unnamed man in a crown and sunglasses, Queen of Spades is a woman in a ponytail and sunglasses, and Ten of Spades is an unnamed orange-haired woman in sunglasses. It is unclear what ties the third gang has or had—if any—to its predecessors and successors.

A branch of the Royal Flush Gang based in Las Vegas, Nevada appeared in Zatanna #4. Rather than using a playing card motif, each member of the Vegas branch is modeled after a member of the Rat Pack (such as Frank Sinatra, Sammy Davis Jr. and Dean Martin). It is unclear if there are still 52 cells throughout the country, or 52 members in total. A lower ranked member mentions that there are four Queens, but Fortune states that the group is constantly growing.

The New 52
In 2011, "The New 52" rebooted the DC universe. The Royal Flush Gang are seen engaging the Justice League. They consist of an Ace android, King of Spades, Queen of Spades, and Jack of Spades. With help from Technician, the Justice League defeated the Royal Flush Gang.

Another incarnation of the Royal Flush Gang appears in the "Forever Evil" storyline. The group consists of Ace of Spades, King of Spades, Jack of Clubs, Queen of Clubs, and Ten of Clubs. They appear as members of the Secret Society of Super Villains at the time when the Crime Syndicate arrive from their world. While Heat Wave sacrifices himself so that the other Rogues can get away from Black Mask, Clayface, and Mr. Freeze, the remaining Rogues are confronted by the Royal Flush Gang members Ace of Spades, Ace of Diamonds, Ace of Hearts, Jack of Diamonds, and Jack of Hearts. The Royal Flush Gang orders them to surrender if they don't want Golden Glider to die. The Royal Flush Gang members Ace of Spades, Ace of Diamonds, Jack of Clubs, Jack of Diamonds, and Eight of Hearts were seen guarding the hospital where Golden Glider is recuperating. Mirror Master uses his tricks to create mirror illusions of the Rogues to fool them so that they can get to Golden Glider. The Rogues ride off in an armored truck where Ace of Diamonds was hit by it. When Johnny Quick of the Crime Syndicate shows up, he kills Ace of Spades.

Another incarnation of the Royal Flush Gang attacks Superman when his identity of Clark Kent gets known. King is an unnamed man who is the leader of the Royal Flush Gang, Queen is an unnamed woman who is the second-in-command of the Royal Flush Gang, Jack is an unnamed Man, and Ace and Ten are an unnamed sister and brother. They were defeated by Superman and left for the police.

DC Rebirth
In 2016, DC Comics implemented another relaunch of its books called "DC Rebirth", which restored its continuity to a form much as it was prior to "The New 52". The Royal Flush Gang have their design from Batman Beyond, including traveling on a flying playing card. They are among the many villains aiming to kill Batman to stop Two-Face from revealing information. They descend on KGBeast and ask him the location of Batman and Duke Thomas. KGBeast throws a bomb onto the bottom of their playing card, presumably to take out his rivals in stopping Batman. In the 2022-23 limited series The Gotham Game, the Royal Flush Gang, consisting of the King and Queen of Hearts (married couple Rex and Regina Quintain), Jack, Ten and Bluff (son of the King and Queen of Diamonds), are taken over by Punchline and help her to  manufacture and distribute her drug XO in Gotham.

Other versions

Elseworlds
In the miniseries Kingdom Come by Mark Waid and Alex Ross, King is a member of Lex Luthor's Mankind Liberation Front. He apparently has gone separate from the Gang, but carries a cigarette pack with playing card markings and speaks in metaphors drawn from card games. There is also a man in the Justice League's prison who appears to be a new version of the Ace of Spades. According to the Elliot S! Maggin novelization, King is also newly immortal, and Vandal Savage's protege.

JLA/Avengers
In the crossover series JLA/Avengers, the group appears as lackeys of Krona who attack Green Arrow and Hawkeye. King is shown being defeated by Jack of Hearts.

In other media

Television
 The Royal Flush Gang appears in The Super Powers Team: Galactic Guardians episode "The Wild Cards", with King voiced by Eugene Williams, Queen by Arlene Golonka, Jack by Jerry Houser, and Ten by Lynne Moody. This version of the group is a quartet of thieves recruited by the mysterious Ace, later revealed to be the Joker, who aligned himself with Darkseid to create a dimensional warp from Earth to Apokolips disguised as a house of cards. After Batman deduces the Joker's identity and foils the plot, Ten defects while the Joker and the rest of the gang are captured.
 Three different incarnations of the Royal Flush Gang appear in series set in the DC Animated Universe (DCAU):
 The first incarnation appears in Batman Beyond, with King voiced by George Lazenby, Queen by Amanda Donohoe in season one and Sarah Douglas in all subsequent appearances, their son Jack by Scott Cleverdon in season one and Nicholas Guest in season three, and their daughter Melanie Walker / Ten by Olivia d'Abo, while Ace is silent. This futuristic version of the group is a multi-generational family of criminals who use high-tech, playing card-themed weapons and an android serving as Ace. Additionally, they previously encountered the original Batman, Bruce Wayne, who nearly succeeded in disbanding the gang's predecessors. Throughout their appearances, the gang battle Wayne's successor Terry McGinnis, who falls in love with Melanie and eventually motivates her to leave the group. Following this, the gang struggle to maintain their criminal power and work with their employer Paxton Powers to assassinate Wayne, only to be thwarted by McGinnis. In the aftermath, Ace is destroyed, King and Queen are arrested, the former is revealed to have been pursuing an affair with Powers' secretary due to an inferiority complex stemming from Queen comparing him unfavorably to his late predecessor and father-in-law, and Jack is bailed out by Melanie, who helps him get a job at the restaurant she works at.
 The second incarnation appears in the Justice League two-part episode "Wild Cards", with King voiced by Scott Menville, Queen by Tara Strong, Jack by Greg Cipes, Ten by Khary Payton, and Ace by Hynden Walch. This version of the group are five Project Cadmus-trained, metahuman teenagers each with their own unique abilities: King possesses pyrokinesis, Queen possesses metallokinesis, Jack has complete body elasticity, Ten has super-strength comparable to Superman, and Ace has powerful psionic abilities. The Joker finds them and turns them into his Royal Flush Gang so he can attack Las Vegas and battle the Justice League on live television while he secretly uses Ace to drive millions of viewers insane. After the Leaguers capture most of the gang, Batman discovers the Joker kept a collar that Ace's government handlers used to control her as insurance against her. Realizing that Joker was using her, an enraged Ace puts him in a catatonic state before disappearing.
 The third incarnation appears in a flashback in the Justice League Unlimited episode "Epilogue", with Ace voiced again by Walch while the rest of the gang are silent. This version of the group was formed by a lonely and depressed Ace, who developed reality-warping powers. She used them to turn four random people into a new Royal Flush Gang to play with her, but they chose to abandon her and use their powers for crime. Their aforementioned powers are puns based partially on their names: King is a massive head with small limbs resembling Egg Fu and Marvel Comics character MODOK who flew on a throne and fired beams from his eyes; Queen is a large man given the appearance of a woman with enhanced strength; Jack is a samurai; and Ten is a woman with long, extendible cornrows she can use like a whip. While the Justice League battled the empowered criminals, Cadmus member Amanda Waller revealed that Ace was dying due to an aneurysm and a possible psychic backlash caused by her death could kill millions. Batman volunteered to kill her before that could happen and confronted her, but Ace knew he was not going to do so. After briefly explaining her backstory to him, she asked him to stay with her until she died. Batman accepted, allowing Ace to die peacefully without harming anyone as well as restore the gang to normal.
 The Royal Flush Gang appear in Batman: The Brave and the Bold, with Ace voiced by Diedrich Bader and Jack by Edoardo Ballerini while King and Queen are silent. This version of the gang are Old West bandits who oppose Jonah Hex and Cinnamon.
 Three incarnations of the Royal Flush Gang appear in series set in the Arrowverse:
 The first incarnation appears in the Arrow episode "Legacies", with Derek Reston / King portrayed by Currie Graham, Kyle Reston / Ace by Kyle Schmid, Teddy Reston / Jack by Tom Stevens, and Derek's unnamed wife / Queen by Sarah-Jane Redmond. This version of the group is a family of bank robbers who wear hockey masks marked with their respective playing card. Additionally, Derek previously worked for Queen Industries before its CEO Robert Queen outsourced jobs to China and the Reston family lost their home as a result. Feeling guilty, Robert's son Oliver tries to persuade Derek to right his own wrongs, but is forced to stop the Restons when they attempt to rob another bank. In the ensuing confrontation, Derek is fatally shot while the rest of the family are arrested. During Derek's final moments, Oliver reveals his secret identity to him to show the former that he always had his best interests at heart. Derek admits what he did was wrong and he should not have gotten his family involved before dying in Oliver's arms.
 Two incarnations of the Royal Flush Gang appear in The Flash. The first make a non-speaking cameo appearance in the episode "The Sound and the Fury", consisting of unnamed, masked motorcycle thieves King, Queen, and Ace, who are swiftly apprehended by the Flash. The second appear in the eighth season, consisting of metahumans Mona Taylor / Queen (portrayed by Agam Darshi), the group's leader with psychic abilities; King (portrayed by Ryan Jefferson Booth), who has super-strength; Jake Fox / Jack (portrayed by Eston Fung), who can shoot lasers from his eyes; and Wanda Wayland / Ten (portrayed by Megan Peta Hill), an expert hand-to-hand combatant.
 The Royal Flush Gang appear in the DC Super Hero Girls episode "#AwesomeAuntAntiope".
 Sam Kurtis appears in Stargirl, portrayed by Geoff Stults. After disappearing in the pilot episode, he resurfaces in the episode "Shining Knight", ostensibly to reconnect with his daughter Courtney Whitmore, though he secretly attempts to steal her locket and sell it off for money. However, her stepfather Pat Dugan realizes Kurtis' true intentions and confronts him, telling him to never return.

Film
The second incarnation of the Royal Flush Gang appears in Justice League: Doom, with King voiced by Jim Meskimen, Queen voiced by an uncredited Grey DeLisle, Jack voiced by an uncredited Robin Atkin Downes, Ten voiced by Juliet Landau, and Ace voiced by Bruce Timm. This version of the group have similar or altered abilities from the comics' original version. King wields a scepter capable of electrocuting targets at point blank range while Queen wields cards she can throw with incredible accuracy and speed as well as enough strength to cut through Batman's grappling lines. Additionally, Jack's laser eye, Ace's android construction, and Ten's energy blasts have not been changed, though Ten's explosive playing cards are not seen. The Royal Flush Gang attempt to rob a bank using dimensional phasing technology, but are foiled by the Justice League. However, they are unable to find out who supplied the Royal Flush Gang with their technology as they did not know themselves. Unbeknownst to the Leaguers, Vandal Savage used the gang as a distraction so Mirror Master could infiltrate the Batcave.

Miscellaneous
 The Royal Flush Gang appears in issue #2 of the Justice League Unlimited tie-in comic book.
 The Royal Flush Gang appear in issue #6 of the Batman: The Brave and the Bold tie-in comic.
 Ace of the Arrowverse's first Royal Flush Gang appears in issue #23 of the Arrow tie-in comic book.

Further reading
 "10 Things Every DC Fan Should Know About the Royal Flush Gang" by Dylan Musselman, CBR.com (Aug 28, 2019)
 "All In: A History of the Royal Flush Gang" by Kyle Dodson, DCUniverse.com (Jan 31, 2020)

References

External links
 Royal Flush Gang entry on DCU Guide

Comics characters introduced in 1966
Fictional gangs
Fictional quartets
Fictional professional thieves
DC Comics supervillain teams
Characters created by Gardner Fox
Characters created by Mike Sekowsky
Fictional super soldiers